Loricaria pumila is a species of catfish in the family Loricariidae. It is native to South America, being known from Brazil, where it occurs in the Amazon River basin, near the mouths of the Tapajós and the Pará River, including the lower Tocantins River. It is reportedly typically found at depths between 3 and 29 m (10 and 95 ft) and distances of 15 to 1500 m (49 to 4921 ft) from the shoreline, in environments characterized by a substrate of silt and organic detritus. An analysis of the stomach contents of a single individual found evidence of feeding on insects and aquatic insect larvae, as well as sand and detritus. The species reaches 8.1 cm (3.2 inches) in standard length and is believed to be a facultative air-breather. Its specific epithet, pumila, is derived from Latin and means "dwarf", referring to the small adult size of the species.

References 

Loricariidae
Fish described in 2008